Ronald Mark Benton (born 1937) is a former Australian rules footballer who played with West Adelaide in the South Australian National Football League (SANFL).

Benton made his debut for West Adelaide in 1955 shortly before his 17th birthday. His first kick in league football saw him score the first of 198 goals for the club. He played 184 games for West Adelaide and in 1957 he won the SANFL's highest individual honor, the Magarey Medal, as well as winning West Adelaide's Best & Fairest award.

Ron Benton was also a member of West's 1961 premiership team playing on the half-forward flank as West Adelaide defeated Norwood for their first premiership win since 1947. The Grand Final was played on September 30 and in what became known as the 'Turkish Bath Grand Final' due to it being played in 35°C heat, West prevailed over the Redlegs 16.13 (109) to 11.7 (73) in front of 40,909 at the Adelaide Oval with the oppressive heat blamed for the lowest Grand Final attendance since West defeated Norwood in 1947. Benton was one of West's best players on the day with 21 kicks, 2 handballs, 4 marks and he kicked 2 goals.

He was West Adelaide's leading goal kicker in 1963 with 29 goals.

References

External links

West Adelaide Hall of Fame profile

West Adelaide Football Club players
Magarey Medal winners
Living people
1937 births
Date of birth missing (living people)
Australian rules footballers from South Australia